Norton Center is a census-designated place (CDP) in the town of Norton in Bristol County, Massachusetts, United States. The population was 2,671 at the 2010 census.

Geography
Norton Center is located at  (41.969851, -71.183657).

According to the United States Census Bureau, the CDP has a total area of 4.7 km2 (1.8 mi2), all land.

Demographics

As of the census of 2000, there were 2,618 people, 436 households, and 312 families residing in the CDP. The population density was 555.4/km2 (1,438.6/mi2). There were 442 housing units at an average density of 93.8/km2 (242.9/mi2). The racial makeup of the CDP was 65.66% White, 1.57% African American, 0.27% Native American, 1.45% Asian, 29.37% from other races, and 1.68% from two or more races. Hispanic or Latino of any race were 3.48% of the population.

There were 436 households, out of which 36.0% had children under the age of 18 living with them, 59.6% were married couples living together, 9.4% had a female householder with no husband present, and 28.4% were non-families. 20.6% of all households were made up of individuals, and 4.6% had someone living alone who was 65 years of age or older. The average household size was 2.64 and the average family size was 3.06.

In the CDP, the population was spread out, with 11.2% under the age of 18, 55.6% from 18 to 24, 18.0% from 25 to 44, 12.0% from 45 to 64, and 3.2% who were 65 years of age or older. The median age was 21 years. For every 100 females, there were 73.6 males. For every 100 females age 18 and over, there were 71.0 males.

The median income for a household in the CDP was $66,176, and the median income for a family was $84,624. Males had a median income of $44,609 versus $36,736 for females. The per capita income for the CDP was $16,533. None of the families and 8.8% of the population were below the poverty line. None of those under the age of 18 or those 65 and older were living below the poverty line.

References

Census-designated places in Bristol County, Massachusetts
Greater Taunton Area
Providence metropolitan area
Census-designated places in Massachusetts